Man vs. Beast is a series of sensationalistic television specials aired in the United States by the Fox television network in 2003. The shows were produced by Brian Richardson and directed by Bob Levy. They involve a variety of challenges in which people and animals compete against each other. Although the initial special, Man vs. Beast, was panned by critics and animal rights groups, Fox commissioned a sequel, Man vs. Beast 2, which aired on February 20, 2004.

In 2003, ITV commissioned Granada Productions to re-create the American special for British audiences. A six-part series was filmed, hosted by John Fashanu. However, owing to heavy lobbying by animal rights groups, transmission of the series was postponed indefinitely.

Competitions
The competitions included the following matchups:
 Professional eater Takeru Kobayashi lost a hot dog eating contest against a Kodiak bear that did not know it was in an eating competition.
 Scott Helvenston, a US Navy SEAL, won a race against a chimpanzee through an obstacle course.
 A group of 44 dwarfs lost a race against an Asian elephant to see which could pull a McDonnell Douglas DC-10 jet a certain distance first.
 Shawn Crawford, a world-class sprinter, won a 100-metre race against a giraffe but lost against a zebra.
 A Sumo wrestler lost a tug-of-war against a large, female orangutan.

References

External links

Man vs. Beast, synopsis and scheduled listings at FoxReality.com

2000s American television specials
Fox Broadcasting Company original programming
Sports entertainment
2003 television specials
2003 in American television